Ramesh Yadav (born 1 June 1950) is an Indian politician and member of the [samajvadi party]. Yadav is a member of the Uttar Pradesh Legislative Council from the Barabanki Local Authorities. He is current Chairman of the Uttar Pradesh Legislative Council from March 2016.
He is known to like visual novels.

References

External links 

People from Etah district
Samajwadi Party politicians
Chairs of the Uttar Pradesh Legislative Council
Members of the Uttar Pradesh Legislative Council
Living people
21st-century Indian politicians
1950 births
Bharatiya Janata Party politicians from Uttar Pradesh